Events from the year 1940 in Italy.

Incumbents
King: Victor Emmanuel III
Prime Minister: Benito Mussolini

Events
18 March – In a meeting with Adolf Hitler at the Brenner Pass, Benito Mussolini undertakes to bring Italy into World War II.

Literature and culture 

March 16 – Bernardo Bertolucci, Italian writer and film director
July 31 – Fleur Jaeggy, Swiss-Italian fiction writer

Cinema

Births
3 January – Leo de Berardinis, Italian stage actor, theatre director (d. 2008)  
19 January – Paolo Borsellino, judge and magistrate (d. 1992)
24 June 
 Augusto Fantozzi, lawyer, tax expert, academic, businessman and politician (d. 2019)  
 Vittorio Storaro, cinematographer
16 October – Ivan Della Mea, singer-songwriter (d. 2009)
24 October – Giacomo Bulgarelli, Italian association football player (d. 2009)  
2 November – Gigi Proietti, actor, singer, and comedian (d. 2020) 
26 November – Gianni De Michelis, politician (d. 2019)
18 December – Ilario Castagner, footballer and manager

Deaths

April 28 – Luisa Tetrazzini, Italian opera singer (b. 1871)
June 28 – Italo Balbo, Italian Fascist leader (b. 1896)
July 10 – Pietro Frugoni, Italian general (b. 1851)

See also
Italian Campaign (World War II)

References

 
Italy
Italy
1940s in Italy
Years of the 21st century in Italy